Stefano Gallio (born 16 May 1908 in Marostica) was an Italian professional football player.

Honours
 Serie A champion: 1929/30.

1908 births
Year of death missing
People from Marostica
Italian footballers
Serie A players
Inter Milan players
Association football defenders
Sportspeople from the Province of Vicenza
Footballers from Veneto